The Antalya Open is an ATP Tour 250 series tennis tournament on the ATP Tour launched in June 2017 in Antalya, Turkey. The tournament was played on grass courts until 2019. In 2021 it was played on hard courts.

Results

Singles

Doubles

References

External links 
Official website 

 
ATP Tour 250
Grass court tennis tournaments
Tennis tournaments in Turkey
Sports competitions in Antalya
Recurring sporting events established in 2017
2017 establishments in Turkey